Sawan (Hindi: सावन, Punjabi: ਸਾਵਣ) is a fifth month in the Hindu calendar.

Sawan may also refer to:

People
Sawan Dutta, Indian music director, composer, songwriter, record producer, vocalist and Vlogger 
Sawan Faqir (died 1918), classical Sindhi poet 
Sawan Serasinghe (born 1994), Australian badminton player
Sawan Singh (1858–1948), also known as "The Great Master" or "Bade Maharaj Ji", was an Indian Saint
Wael Sawan (born 1974), Lebanese-Canadian business executive

Places
Sawan, Buleleng, a district (kecamatan) in the regency of Buleleng in northern Bali, Indonesia
Sawan Airport, a private domestic airport, located in Sindh, Pakistan

Others
Sawan Airlines, was an airline company that provided flights between Iraq's cities Erbil and Sulaimaniyah and some cities in Europe

See also
Nakhon Sawan (disambiguation)
Nakhon Sawan, a city (thesaban nakhon) in Thailand
Nakhon Sawan Province, Thailand
Na Sawan, a sub-district (tambon) in Mueang Bueng Kan District, in Bueng Kan Province, northeastern Thailand
Tell es-Sawwan, an important Samarran period archaeological site in Saladin Province, Iraq.